Min Young-Ki (born March 28, 1976) is a South Korean retired football player.

References

1976 births
Living people
South Korean footballers
Ulsan Hyundai FC players
Ulsan Hyundai Mipo Dockyard FC players
Daegu FC players
Daejeon Hana Citizen FC players
Busan IPark players
K League 1 players
Korea National League players
Association football defenders
Gyeongsang National University alumni